Entonomenia is a genus of cavibelonian solenogasters, shell-less, worm-like mollusks.

Species
 Entonomenia atlantica Leloup, 1948
 Entonomenia carinata (Salvini-Plawen, 1978)
 Entonomenia cristata (Salvini-Plawen, 1978)
 Entonomenia microporata (Handl & Salvini-Plawen, 2002)
 Entonomenia rhynchopharyngeata (Salvini-Plawen, 1978)
 Entonomenia sertulariicola (Salvini-Plawen, 1978)
 Entonomenia tricarinata (Salvini-Plawen, 1978)

References

 Leloup, E. (1948). Un nouveau solénogastre pronéoméniide, Entonomenia atlantica G. nov., sp. nov. [A new Solenogastra species: Entonomenia atlantica g. nov., sp. nov.]. Bull. Mus. royal d'Hist. Nat. Belg./Med. Kon. Natuurhist. Mus. Belg. 24(37): 1-11

External links
 Gofas, S.; Le Renard, J.; Bouchet, P. (2001). Mollusca. in: Costello, M.J. et al. (eds), European Register of Marine Species: a check-list of the marine species in Europe and a bibliography of guides to their identification. Patrimoines Naturels. 50: 180-213

Solenogastres